Damask may refer to:

 A tapestry-woven fabric, see Damask
 Damask, Iran, a village in Razavi Khorasan Province, Iran
 A flower commonly known as the Damask rose or simply as "Damask", see Rosa damascena
 A fictional character in the Marvel Comics Universe, see Emma Steed
 A fictional character from Star Wars named Hego Damask, alias Darth Plagueis